Cristian Humberto Carbajal Díaz (born 20 September 1999) is a Peruvian footballer who plays as a left-back for Deportivo Binacional, on loan from Sporting Cristal.

Club career

Sporting Cristal
Carbajal is a product of Sporting Cristal. On 31 March 2019, 19-year old Carbajal made his professional debut for Sporting Cristal in the Peruvian Primera División against Deportivo Municipal. Carbajal was in the starting lineup and assisted the first goal that led the victory of Cristal, before he was subbed of in the 69th minute.

On 2 July 2019, Carbajal was loaned out to Alianza Universidad for the rest of the year to gain playing experience. He added 882 minutes of playing time in the 11 games he played in 2019. On 5 January 2020, the loan deal was extended for one further year. In January 2021, the loan deal was extended for one more year.

Carbajal returned to Sporting Cristal for the 2022 season and signed a two-year contract extension with the club on 12 January 2022. In July 2022, Carbajal was loaned out to Deportivo Binacional until the end of the year.

References

External links
 
 

Living people
1999 births
Association football defenders
Peruvian footballers
Peruvian Primera División players
Sporting Cristal footballers
Alianza Universidad footballers
Deportivo Binacional FC players
Footballers from Lima